The White Peak Estate (previously known as the South Peak Estate) of the National Trust comprises several land holdings in the Southern Peak District.

Ilam Park, including Ilam Hall which is let to the Youth Hostel Association (YHA)
Dovedale from Thorpe Cloud to Wolfscote Dale and Biggin Dale
Wetton Hill and Wetton Mill
Ossam's Hill
Hamps Valley Woodlands (and Beeston Tor)
Grindon Moor
Ecton
Land at Monyash
Alsop Moor
Stanton Moor Edge
Ravenstor YHA
Taddington Wood
High Weeldon
Winster Market House (the National Trust's first property in the Peak District, 1906)

Dovedale itself was acquired in 1934, and a string of acquisitions followed until 1938; Wolfscote Dale was acquired in 1948.

External links
South Peak Estate information at the National Trust
Peak District, National Trust

National Trust properties in Staffordshire
Peak District